Osvaldo Enrique Artaza Barrios (born 5 July 1955) is a Chilean physician who has served as minister of health administration.

References

External links
 Profile at UDLA

Living people
1955 births
21st-century Chilean politicians
University of Chile alumni
Chilean Ministers of Justice
People from Santiago
Academic staff of the University of the Americas (Chile)